The CTA Holiday Train is a Chicago 'L' train which traditionally runs during the winter holidays, from November to December. Six cars are traditional passenger cars adorned with seasonal decorations and bright lights.  The interior of these cars are adorned with multi-color lights, red bows, garland, and red and green overhead lighting.  The hand poles are transformed into inedible candy canes.  Santa Claus rides on an open-air flatcar and waves to the passengers coming aboard from his sleigh.

History 

The CTA Holiday train began in 1992.  That first year, employees posted a sign on the front of the train that read, "Seasons Greeting from the CTA."  The train delivered food to various charities around the city.  Since then, the decorations have become much more elaborate.  Now, there is a flatcar for Santa and his reindeer; and the interior is covered with lights, paper, streamers and decorative signs.

Schedule 
The Holiday Train visits every Chicago 'L' station on every line throughout its run during November and December.  The train operates from about 1 p.m. to 9 p.m. on weekends and 3 p.m. to 7 p.m. on select weekdays and makes all scheduled stops at stations along the line.

Charity run 
Over the period of five days a week, the CTA Holiday Train delivers food baskets to local community organizations at various stops.  Food baskets contain various foods for a complete meal; these include canned ham, potatoes, mixed vegetables, fruits and a dessert.

Reception
The song "CTA X-mas Train", describing the Holiday Train, by the Snow Angels was the winner of the Chicago Tribune's New Holiday Classics Christmas song contest in 2009.

It narrowly avoided being shut down by CTA president Frank Kruesi after the budget cuts of 2004.  A spokesman said, "It didn't seem appropriate to devote resources to this project when 1,250 positions are being eliminated".  He was, however, overruled by CTA board chair Carole Brown.

Today the cost to the CTA to run the train is minimal.  Decorations are reused from year to year or donated by CTA employees.  As the trains run regular service, most workers are either on their regular schedules or volunteering their time.

References

External links 
 

Trains
Winter traditions
Chicago Transit Authority
Railway services introduced in 1992